The black-backed bush tanager (Urothraupis stolzmanni), also known as the black-backed bush-finch, is a species of bird in the family Thraupidae.  It is the only member in the genus Urothraupis.  It is found in Colombia and Ecuador.  Its natural habitat is subtropical or tropical moist montane forests.

Taxonomy
The black-backed bush tanager was formally described in 1885 by Władysław Taczanowski and Hans von Berlepsch from specimens collected by the Polish zoologist Jan Sztolcman (sometimes written Jean Stolzmann) on the eastern slopes of the Tungurahua Volcano in central Ecuador. The ornithologists introduced the monospecific genus Urothraupis and coined the binomial name Urothraupis stolzmanni. The genus name combines the Ancient Greek oura meaning "tail" with thraupis, an unidentified small bird, used by ornithologist for tanagers. The specific epithet honors the collector Sztolcman/Stolzmann. A 2014 molecular phylogenetic study of the tanager family Thraupidae found that the black-backed bush tanager is a member of the subfamily Poospizinae and has a sister relationship to the pardusco in the monospecific genus Nephelornis. The black-backed bush tanager  is monotypic: no subspecies are recognised.

References

External links
Xeno-canto: audio recordings of the black-backed bush tanager

black-backed bush tanager
Birds of the Colombian Andes
Birds of the Ecuadorian Andes
black-backed bush tanager
Taxonomy articles created by Polbot